The Jamia Miftahul Uloom is an Islamic School in India. It is located at Shahi Katra, a town in the Mau district of the Indian state of Uttar Pradesh. It was founded in 1877 by Imamuddin Punjabi.

Alumni
 Asir Adrawi
 Zafeeruddin Miftahi
 Mahfoozur Rahman Miftahi
 Maulana mahfoozurahman miftahi mauvi

References

Islamic education in India
Schools in Uttar Pradesh
Mau district
Educational institutions established in 1877
1877 establishments in India